Donovan Arp (born January 12, 1978) is a former Arena Football League offensive lineman/defensive lineman. He has also played for the Austin Wranglers. He played college football for the University of Louisville.

High school years
Growing up in a Samoan American family, Arp attended Murray High School in Murray, Utah, and was a letterman in football, rugby union, and track & field. In football, he won All-Region honors as a senior.

References

External links
Austin Wranglers' player page
arenafan.com player page
NFL.com player page

1978 births
Living people
American football offensive linemen
American football defensive linemen
Louisville Cardinals football players
Buffalo Destroyers players
Columbus Destroyers players
Philadelphia Soul players
Grand Rapids Rampage players
Cleveland Gladiators players
Austin Wranglers players
People from Murray, Utah
Players of American football from Utah
American sportspeople of Samoan descent